Karupaiya s/o Muthusami (4 February 1953 – 16 November 2022) was a Malaysian politician who served as the Member of Parliament (MP) for Padang Serai from May 2018 to his death in November 2022. He was a member and Division Chief of Padang Serai of the People's Justice Party (PKR), a component party of the Pakatan Harapan (PH) opposition coalition. He was also patron of both the Malaysian Indian Armed Forces (PERIM) and the Former Malaysian Armed Forces as well as member of the board of the Institute of Postgraduate Studies (IPS) of the Bukit Mertajam Tamil School.

Personal life and death 
On 16 November 2022, Karupaiya died from a heart attack while campaigning for the 2022 general election. He was seeking the second term as the Padang Serai MP by contesting in the election representing PH and PKR after serving the first from 2018 to his death in 2022 for four years. Later the same day, the Election Commission (EC) offered its condolences to his family while informing that the EC would hold a special meeting two days later on 18 November 2022, which was also a day prior to the election to decide on the dates of the Padang Serai election. He explained that the EC had received an Election Writ by the Managing Officer in Padang Serai over the death of Karupaiya.

Election results

References

1953 births
2022 deaths
Malaysian people of Tamil descent
Malaysian politicians of Indian descent
People's Justice Party (Malaysia) politicians
Members of the Dewan Rakyat
21st-century Malaysian politicians
People from Kedah